Brian Dabul was the defending champion, but decided not to participate.
Guido Pella won the title, defeating Maximiliano Estévez 6–4, 7–5 in the final.

Seeds

Draw

Finals

Top half

Bottom half

References
 Main Draw
 Qualifying Draw

Manta Open - Singles
Manta Open